Demonic Resurrection is a blackened death metal band from Mumbai, India, formed in 2000. Its current line-up consists of Sahil "The Demonstealer" Makhija on vocals and rhythm guitar and Virendra "Viru" Kaith on drums. Since its formation, the band has released five studio albums and one EP. The band's fourth album, The Demon King, was released on 13 July 2014 in India, 14 July in Europe and 15 July in the US by Candlelight Records and distributed in India by Universal Music.

History

Early years and Demonstealer (2000–2002)
The band was officially formed in March 2000 by several 17-year-old teenagers with the main focus to play extreme metal. Within nine months the band released their first album Demonstealer through Demonstealer Records. The album's musical influences were bands like Theatre of Tragedy, The Gathering, and Lacuna Coil. The album also featured a female vocalist.

Shortly after the release of the album, the band faced many problems, and most of the members left. The line-up of the band finally stabilized in 2001, with Sahil "The Demonstealer" Makhija on vocals and guitars, Count Varathora on bass, Nikita Shah on vocals and keyboards and Yash Pathak on the drums. The band has re-recorded Demonstealer with the current lineup. The Brazilian record label Vampiria Records released a tape version of the album in the local market.

A Darkness Descends (2002–2007)
In 2002, the group disbanded, but reformed in 2003 with a new-lineup: Husain Bandukwala on bass, Mephisto on keyboards, JP on drums and Sahil Makhija on vocals and guitars.

The band enlisted lead guitarist Pradeep Pande in 2006 but the same year also saw the exit of drummer JP due to musical differences. The band recorded their EP and third studio effort Beyond The Darkness, which featured on a split CD titled Rise of the Eastern Blood along with bands Dusk from Pakistan and Severe Dementia from Bangladesh. Since the band had no drummer, Sahil Makhija took up the drum duties for the EP. Beyond the Darkness saw a slightly more experimental side of the band, adding ambiance and spacey, ethereal textures to their sound. Filmmaker Sam Dunn (Metal: A Headbanger's Journey, Iron Maiden: Flight 666) featured the band in his documentary Global Metal. Demonic Resurrection also made it to the soundtrack of Global Metal along with Lamb of God, Sepultura and In Flames.

Beyond the Darkness (2007–2009)
In August 2007, Virendra ‘Viru’ Kaith joined the band as a permanent drummer. The band continued touring and writing new material, until Pradeep quit in 2008 and was replaced by the 18-year-old guitarist Daniel Rego. In 2009, the band bagan touring across India, becoming the support acts for Opeth in February 2009 and for Amon Amarth and Textures in December 2009.

The Return to Darkness (2009–2013)
The band returned to the studio in August 2009 to record their third album and the final chapter of the Darkness trilogy: The Return to Darkness. Michael ‘Xaay’ Lorac (Nile, Behemoth, Vader) designed the artwork for the album, and the band also released their first video for ‘The Unrelenting Surge of Vengeance’ that received (and continues to receive) airplay from mainstream music channels like VH1. The album was officially released in January 2010 through  Candlelight Records (which they were signed to in April 2010) for worldwide distribution. The album was followed by a nationwide tour: "The Resurrection Festival". The band marked 10 years of existence with their first international show at the Inferno Metal Festival in Norway in April 2010 and played at the Brutal Assault festival in the Czech Republic in August 2010. The band released their first music video, 'The Unrelenting Surge of Vengeance' from their 2010 album, The Return to Darkness. The music video received a U/A rating from the Central Board of Film Certification, allowing it to be aired on Indian national TV.

In 2012, bass guitar player Husain Bandukwala left the band due to personal and family commitments, but went on to become the band's manager. The band soon announced Ashwin Shriyan as their new bassist. In 2014, lead guitarist, Daniel Kenneth Rego parted ways with the band to explore other musical possibilities. The band played a farewell show with Rego at the Blue Frog in Mumbai on 19 January 2014.

The Demon King (2013–2017)
On 22 May 2014, Demonic Resurrection revealed the artwork and track list for their fourth album titled The Demon King. The artwork was, once again, done by Michal ‘Xaay’ Loranc who had done the band's previous album cover for The Return to Darkness.

The album was released on 13 July in India, 14 July in Europe and 15 July in the US by Candlelight Records and distributed in India by Universal Music.

The theme of the album was similar to the 'Darkness' trilogy. The story is about the resurrection of the Demon King who has awakened on the Earth for the destruction of humankind, the apocalypse. Recorded in the year 2013, Daniel Rego is the guitarist credited for the tracks although Nishith Hegde became the new guitarist.

On 25 May 2014, the band released a preview video for The Demon King on YouTube.

Viru garnered a lot of praise for his drumming with the media bringing attention to Indian metal through interviews with MensXP.com, Polkacafe and India Today in addition to appearing in an advertisement for Signature whisky.

Dashavatar (2017–present)
On 15 March 2017, the band released their latest studio album, named Dashavatar - or the 10 forms - continuing on the use of Hindu mythology, also adapted for their previous album. It was released on Sahil Makhija's Demonstealar Records. The album was scored 9/10 by Metal Injection.

Album track listing
 Matsya – The Fish
 Kurma – The Tortoise
 Varaha – The Boar
 Vamana – The Dwarf
 Narasimha – The Man-Lion
 Parashurama – The Axe Wielder
 Rama – The Prince
 Krishna – The Cowherd
 Buddha – The Teacher
 Kalki – The Destroyer of Filth

On 19 April 2018, in an interview with Rolling Stone India, Sahil Makhija said it was time to call it quits.

Musical style and influences
Demonic Resurrection describe their music as blackened death metal, though it can also be called symphonic black metal. Cradle of Filth, Dimmu Borgir, Emperor, Depresy, Cannibal Corpse and Darkthrone are some of the bands that have influenced the band from the earliest albums. Use of signature black and death metal motifs like growling vocals, shrieked vocals, highly distorted guitars played with tremolo picking, blast beats and double bass drumming along with ambient keyboards and clean vocal passages often serving as a bridge between two heavy parts is prevalent. All through the "Darkness" trilogy, Demonic Resurrection sees their music as a mixture of black and death metal with elements of power metal easily visible, most notably attributed to acts like Blind Guardian and Angra.

Band members

Current members
 Sahil "The Demonstealer" Makhija – vocals, rhythm guitar (2000–present), lead guitar (2001–2006)
 Virendra "Viru" Kaith – drums (2007–present)
 Aditya Swaminathan - lead guitar

Former members
 Daniel Kenneth Rego – lead guitar (2008–2014)
 Nandani – female vocals (2000)
 Nikita Shah – vocals, keyboards (2000–2003)
 Yash Pathak - drums (2000 - 2002)
 Ashish Modasia – lead guitar (2000)
 Prashant Shah – lead guitar (2000–2001)
 Pradeep Pande – lead guitar (2006–2008)
 Aditya Mehta – bass guitar (2000–2003)
 Husain Bandukwala – bass guitar (2002–2012)
 JP - drums (2003–2007)
 Mephisto – keyboards (2003–2016)
 Ashwin Shriyan – bass guitar (2012–2017) 
 Nishith Hegde – lead guitar (2013–2018)

Touring musicians
 Leon Quadros - bass guitar (2017–present)
 Vigneshkumar Venkatraman - lead guitar (2018–present)

Discography

Studio albums

Other works

Videos
 "Unrelenting Surge of Vengeance" (2010)

Awards
 Metal Hammer Golden Gods Awards (2010)

See also
Indian rock
Kryptos (band)
Nicotine (Metal Band)
Inner Sanctum (band)
Scribe (band)
Bhayanak Maut

References

External links
 

Indian heavy metal musical groups
Blackened death metal musical groups
Melodic death metal musical groups
Musical groups established in 2000
Musical quintets